Robert Malcolm Errington (born 5 July 1939 in Howdon-on-Tyne), also known as R. Malcolm Errington, is a retired British historian who studied ancient Greece and the Classical world. He is a professor emeritus from Queen's University Belfast and the University of Marburg.

Life and career

Errington is the son of a teacher. He studied Classical Antiquity from 1958 to 1963 at Durham University. He was active in Hatfield College Boat Club. In 1961 he achieved a first-class BA. In 1966 he received his PhD from Durham.

From 1966 to 1973 he served as a lecturer and reader at the Queen's University Belfast. From 1973 until his retirement, he taught Ancient History at the University of Marburg. Errington dealt with the structure of the Greek states, the political history of Greece, the political history of Macedonia, the Hellenistic world, the Roman expansion, the Roman-Greek relations before and during the Roman Empire, Roman legal history, Christian history, and the relations of the Eastern and Western Roman Empire. He is a full member of the German Archaeological Institute. From 2001 to 2007 he was project manager of the Inscriptiones Graecae.

Works
 Philopoemen. Clarendon Press, Oxford 1969,  (Zugleich: Durham, Univ., Diss., 1966).
 Geschichte Makedoniens. Von den Anfängen bis zum Untergang des Königreiches. Beck, München 1986, .
 
 Roman Imperial Policy from Julian to Theodosius. Studies in the History of Greece and Rome. University of North Carolina Press, Chapel Hill NC 2006, .
 A History of the Hellenistic World. 323–30 BC (= Blackwell History of the Ancient World.). Blackwell, Malden MA u. a. 2008, .
 Die Verträge der griechisch-römischen Welt von ca. 200 v. Chr. bis zum Beginn der Kaiserzeit (= Die Staatsverträge des Altertums, 4. Band.). Verlag C.H. Beck, München 2020, .

See also

 List of historians by area of study

Citations

1939 births
British historians
Living people
Alumni of Hatfield College, Durham
Academics of Queen's University Belfast
Academic staff of the University of Marburg